Carnation necrotic fleck virus (CNFV) is a plant pathogenic virus of the family Closteroviridae.

External links
 Family Groups - The Baltimore Method

Viral plant pathogens and diseases
Closteroviridae